Lakewood Heights may refer to:
 Lakewood Heights (Atlanta), a neighborhood and historic district of Atlanta, Georgia, United States
 Lakewood Heights, Dallas, a neighborhood of Dallas, Texas, United States

See also 
 Lakewood Heights School, an elementary school in New Brunswick School District 08, Canada
 Lakewood (disambiguation)